Bowala may refer to:
 Bowala (7°16'N 80°37'E)
 Bowala (7°9'N 80°43'E)
 Bowala (7°10'N 80°34'E)